Elkhart Township is the name of two townships in the U.S. state of Indiana:

 Elkhart Township, Elkhart County, Indiana
 Elkhart Township, Noble County, Indiana

Indiana township disambiguation pages